Rajshahi-5 is a constituency represented in the Jatiya Sangsad (National Parliament) of Bangladesh since 2019 by Mansur Rahman of the Awami League.

Boundaries 
The constituency encompasses Durgapur and Puthia upazilas.

History 
The constituency was created for the first general elections in newly independent Bangladesh, held in 1973.

Members of Parliament

Elections

Elections in the 2010s 
Abdul Wadud Dara was re-elected unopposed in the 2014 general election after opposition parties withdrew their candidacies in a boycott of the election.

Elections in the 2000s

Elections in the 1990s 
In 1998, Sheikh Hasina made Md. Alauddin a state minister in her government. This led to his expulsion from the BNP, and to the Election Commission declaring his seat vacant on 11 October 1999 under Article 70 of the Constitution, which penalizes floor-crossing. This triggered a by-election in late 1999, which Alauddin won as an Awami League candidate.

References

External links
 

Parliamentary constituencies in Bangladesh
Rajshahi District